"Horny" is a song by British R&B musician Mark Morrison. It was released in December 1996 as the sixth single from his debut album, Return of the Mack. The song features guest rap vocals by Q-Tee and peaked at number five on the UK Singles Chart. The song also contains an uncredited sample of "Encore" by Cheryl Lynn.

Critical reception
A reviewer from Music Week rated the song four out of five, writing, "Not the most commercial track from Return Of The Mack, but easily the most funky, this streetwise single sounds stronger the more spins it gets."

Track listing

CD1:
 "Horny (C&J Radio Edit)"
 "Horny (D-Influence Slick Mix)"
 "Horny (Mindspell Vocal Beatdown Mix)"
 "Horny (Album Version)"

CD2:
 "Horny (C&J Extended Mix)"
 "Horny (Mack Edit)"
 "Return of the Mack (C&J Radio Edit)"
 "Candy (featuring Daddy Wattsie)"

Charts

References

Mark Morrison songs
1996 singles
Music videos directed by Jake Nava
Songs written by Mark Morrison
Song recordings produced by Cutfather & Joe
1996 songs
Atlantic Records singles